Man Hunt is a 1933 American pre-Code mystery film directed by Irving Cummings and written by Sam Mintz and Leonard Praskins. The film stars Junior Durkin, Charlotte Henry, Dorothy Davenport, Arthur Vinton and Edward LeSaint. The film was released on May 24, 1933, by RKO Pictures.

Plot

Cast 
 Junior Durkin as William 'Junior' Scott, Jr.
 Charlotte Henry as Josie Woodward
 Dorothy Davenport as Mrs. Scott
 Arthur Vinton as James J. Wilkie
 Edward LeSaint as Henry Woodward
 Richard Carle as Sheriff Bascom
 Carl Gross as Abraham Jones

References

External links 
 
 
 
 

1933 films
American black-and-white films
1930s English-language films
Films directed by Irving Cummings
1933 mystery films
American mystery films
RKO Pictures films
1930s American films